The 1933 Ottawa Rough Riders finished in 3rd place in the Interprovincial Rugby Football Union with a 3–3 record and failed to qualify for the playoffs. The Rough Riders won their first three games of the season, including their first win since 1928, but lost their final three games.

Regular season

Standings

Schedule

References

Ottawa Rough Riders seasons